

Macau is a Special Administrative Region on the southern coast of China. It is located at the south of Guangdong Province, on the tip of the peninsula formed by the Zhujiang (Pearl River) estuary on the east and the Xijiang (West River) on the west. It is situated immediately east and south of Zhuhai.

The region comprises the Macau Peninsula and the islands of Taipa and Coloane. Macau was once an island but gradually a connecting sandbar turned into a narrow isthmus. Land reclamation in the 17th century made Macau into a peninsula, and a barrier gate was built to mark the separation between the peninsula and the mainland. Pre-colonial records show that Macau totalled only  but began to increase as a result of Portuguese settlement. Macau's size has gradually increased as result of continued land reclamation, especially on Taipa and Coloane.

The main border crossing between Macau and China is the Portas do Cerco (Barrier Gate) Frontier Checkpoint on the Macau side, and the Gongbei checkpoint on the Chinese side.

Location, size, border, and coastline

Geographic coordinates:

Area
Total: 115.4 km2
Land: 30.4 km2
Water: 85 km2

Land boundaries
Total: 0.34 km
Border city: Zhuhai, Guangdong Province 0.34 km

Coastline
Coastline: 50.63 km
Maritime claims: not specified

Topography

Location: Eastern Asia, bordering the South China Sea and China

Terrain: generally flat
Elevation extremes:
lowest point: South China Sea 0 m
highest point: Coloane Alto

List of highest hills in Macau SAR

Macau has generally flat terrain resulting from extensive land reclamation, but numerous steep hills mark the original natural land mass. The modern high-rise skyline of Macau obscures much of the hilly landscape. The Macau skyline both defines and obscures its topography.

The Macau Peninsula is narrow in shape but varies in terrain.

Climate

Although Macau is located in the tropics, it has a humid subtropical climate (Köppen climate classification Cwa), because the Siberian pressure system in the winter pushes cool air further south than similar semipermanent permanent high pressure systems. However, the heat is generally less intense than many places in mainland China due to the coastal location.

Macau is exposed to tropical storms originating from the southern Pacific Ocean during the summer. Major destruction occurred in September 1874, when a devastating typhoon hit Macau and high seas swept across the low-lying area of the peninsula. There are always a few tropical storm occurrences in Macau each year (typically between May to October), although they vary in strengths. When they occur, they usually bring strong winds, rainfall and lower temperatures.

Prevailing winds and weather types change follow the monsoon pattern. It is warm and moist when the southeast and southwest winds are coming from the Pacific Ocean, and typhoons are relatively common during summertime. It is dry and slightly cold when the north winds are coming from Siberia or the northern part of Mainland China.

During the transition period from northeast monsoon to southwest monsoon (March and April), the weather is moist and foggy. It is Macau's spring season. Summer is from May to September, when the southeast and southwest monsoon prevailing. It is rather hot and rainy. The weather in autumn (the end of September and October) is sunny and warm, when the southwest monsoon withdrawing gradually and the northeast monsoon advancing south. It is generally regarded as the most comfortable season there. Winter is from November to February next year, when the northeast monsoon prevailing. It is mainly dry, with occasional cold fronts arriving.

There are moderate to high levels of humidity year-round, with an annual average of 79.3%. Annual sunshine totals are moderate, at more than 1800 hours.

Natural resources
Negligible. In the past, large amounts of granite were extracted from Macau's hills for use as building material.

Fresh water
Relying on water supply from the Xijiang River, in 2006 Macau suffered its worse crisis of salinity in freshwater during the dry season, which takes place in late winter and early spring.
To address salinity issues, as of 2018 three water supply pipelines to Macau have been built and a fourth pipeline was planned for completion in 2019.

Land use and reclamation

Until early 20th century, the Macau peninsula was dotted with small farms on its northern area, beyond the walls protecting the city. Currently, in the Macau peninsula, no arable land, natural pastures or woodland exists and forests have been cleared and plant species have been subjected to profound changes. Coloane on the other hand, due to its later colonisation, still has its forests and is dotted with small farms, namely around the Coloane, Hac Sa and Ka Ho villages.

arable land: 0%
permanent crops: 0%
other: 100% (2011)

In 2010 plans were announced for an additional 3.5 square kilometres of land reclamation in Macau, to be carried out over five years and divided into six phases. These areas cover an area east of the Outer Harbour Ferry Terminal, an area south of Avenida Sun Yat Sen, and the north side of Taipa Island.

The change of total area of Macau (in km square) since the year of 1912:
Note
* - not included in "Total area of Macau"

Environmental factors
Dense urban environment.

Geography – note: essentially urban; three bridges connect the two islands of Coloane and Taipa to the peninsula on mainland, and an isthmus connects Coloane and Taipa.

See also
 Geography of China
 Geography of Hong Kong

References

External links
 Map of Macau in 1997 - University of Macau

 
Macau
Macau
Macau